The 2019 Atlantic Coast Conference (ACC) softball tournament was held at JoAnne Graf Field on the campus of Florida State University in Tallahassee, Florida May 8 through May 11, 2019.

This is the second year of a 10-team tournament. The 1st Round, quarterfinals and semifinals will be shown on the ACC RSN's with a simulcast on ACC Extra. The championship game will be broadcast by ESPN.

Tournament

Only the top 10 participate in the tournament.
All times listed are Eastern Daylight Time.

Schedule

References

2019 Atlantic Coast Conference softball season
Atlantic Coast Conference softball tournament